Hyaenodontidae ("hyena teeth") is a family of extinct predatory mammals from extinct superfamily Hyaenodontoidea within extinct order Hyaenodonta. Hyaenodontids arose during the early Eocene and persisted well into the early Miocene. Fossils of this group have been found in Asia, North America and Europe.

Classification and phylogeny

Taxonomy
 Family: †Hyaenodontidae 
 Genus: †Boritia 
 †Boritia duffaudi 
 Genus: †Neosinopa 
 †Neosinopa gobiensis 
 Genus: †Praecodens 
 †Praecodens acutus 
 Genus: †Preregidens 
 †Preregidens langebadrae 
 Genus: †Protoproviverra 
 †Protoproviverra palaeonictides 
 (unranked): †Cynohyaenodon/Quercytherium clade
 Genus: †Cynohyaenodon (paraphyletic genus) 
 †Cynohyaenodon cayluxi 
 †Cynohyaenodon lautricensis 
 †Cynohyaenodon ruetimeyeri 
 †Cynohyaenodon smithae 
 †Cynohyaenodon trux 
 Genus: †Paracynohyaenodon 
 †Paracynohyaenodon magnus 
 †Paracynohyaenodon schlosseri 
 Genus: †Quercytherium 
 †Quercytherium simplicidens 
 †Quercytherium tenebrosum 
 (unranked): †Eurotherium clade
 Genus: †Alienetherium 
 †Alienetherium buxwilleri 
 Genus: †Cartierodon 
 †Cartierodon egerkingensis 
 Genus: †Eurotherium (paraphyletic genus) 
 †Eurotherium mapplethorpei 
 †Eurotherium matthesi 
 †Eurotherium theriodis 
 Genus: †Paenoxyaenoides 
 †Paenoxyaenoides liguritor 
 Genus: †Prodissopsalis 
 †Prodissopsalis eocaenicus 
 (unranked): †Leonhardtina clade
 Genus: †Leonhardtina 
 †Leonhardtina godinoti 
 †Leonhardtina gracilis 
 †Leonhardtina meridianum 
 (unranked): †Matthodon clade
 Genus: †Matthodon 
 †Matthodon menui 
 †Matthodon peignei 
 †Matthodon tritens 
 (unranked): †Oxyaenoides clade
 Subfamily: †Oxyaenoidinae  (syn. Francotheriini )
 Genus: †Oxyaenoides 
 †Oxyaenoides aumelasiensis 
 †Oxyaenoides bicuspidens 
 †Oxyaenoides lindgreni 
 †Oxyaenoides schlosseri 
 Subfamily: †Hyaenodontinae 
 Genus: †Consobrinus 
 †Consobrinus quercy 
 Genus: †Propterodon (paraphyletic genus) 
 †Propterodon morrisi 
 †Propterodon paganensis 
 †Propterodon tongi 
 †Propterodon witteri 
 Tribe: †Epipterodontini 
 Genus: †Epipterodon 
 †Epipterodon hyaenoides 
 Genus: †Immanopterodon 
 †Immanopterodon acutidens 
 †Immanopterodon implacidus 
 Tribe: †Hyaenodontini 
 Genus: †Hyaenodon 
 †Hyaenodon brachyrhynchus 
 †Hyaenodon chunkhtensis 
 †Hyaenodon dubius 
 †Hyaenodon eminus 
 †Hyaenodon exiguus 
 †Hyaenodon filholi 
 †Hyaenodon gervaisi 
 †Hyaenodon heberti 
 †Hyaenodon leptorhynchus 
 †Hyaenodon minor 
 †Hyaenodon pervagus 
 †Hyaenodon pumilus 
 †Hyaenodon requieni 
 †Hyaenodon rossignoli 
 †Hyaenodon weilini 
 †Hyaenodon yuanchuensis 
 Subgenus: †Neohyaenodon (paraphyletic subgenus) 
 †Hyaenodon gigas 
 †Hyaenodon horridus 
 †Hyaenodon incertus 
 †Hyaenodon macrocephalus 
 †Hyaenodon megaloides 
 †Hyaenodon milvinus 
 †Hyaenodon mongoliensis 
 †Hyaenodon montanus 
 †Hyaenodon vetus 
 Subgenus: †Protohyaenodon (paraphyletic subgenus) 
 †Hyaenodon brevirostrus 
 †Hyaenodon crucians 
 †Hyaenodon microdon 
 †Hyaenodon mustelinus 
 †Hyaenodon raineyi 
 †Hyaenodon venturae

Phylogeny 
The phylogenetic relationships of family Hyaenodontidae are shown in the following cladograms:

See also
 Mammal classification
 Hyaenodontoidea

References

Hyaenodonts
Eocene mammals
Eocene extinctions
Eocene mammals of North America
Prehistoric carnivorans of North America
Extinct mammals of North America
Prehistoric mammal families